Bastards  may refer to:

Film
 Bastards (2006 film), a 2006 Russian film
 Bastards (2013 film), a 2013 French film by Claire Denis
 Father Figures, a 2017 American comedy film originally called Bastards

Music
 Lars Frederiksen and the Bastards, a 2000s American street punk band

Albums
 Bastards (Björk album), 2012
 Bastards (Cerebral Fix album) or the title song, 1991
 Bastards (Motörhead album), 1993
 Bastards (Saigon Kick album), 1999
 ¡Bastardos!, the eighth studio album by rock band Blues Traveler, 2005

Songs
 "Bastards", by the Bloody Hawaiians from The Threegos, 1994
 "Bastards", by Defeater from Letters Home, 2013
 "Bastards", by the Golden Dogs from Everything in 3 Parts, 2004
 "Bastards", by Kesha from Rainbow, 2017
 "Bastards", by Machine Head from Catharsis, 2018
 "Bastards", by the Real McKenzies from Clash of the Tartans, 1998
 "Bastards", by Shut Up and Dance, mixed by Nicolette, from DJ-Kicks: Nicolette, 1997

See also 
 Bastard (disambiguation)
 The Bastards (disambiguation)